The Center for a Free Cuba is a Washington, DC-based organization. It states that it is "an independent, non-partisan institution dedicated to promoting human rights and a transition to democracy and the rule of law on the island. Established in November 1997, the center gathers and disseminates information about Cuba and Cubans to the media, non-governmental organizations, and the international community. The center also assists the people of Cuba through its information outreach and humanitarian programs on the island."

Among the organization's activities it supports the France-based non-governmental group Reporters Without Borders.

Embezzlement by Felipe Sixto 
Felipe Sixto was working as Chief of Staff in the Center for a Free Cuba. In July 2007, Sixto left the Center and joined the White House Office of Intergovernmental Affairs.

The Center's Executive Director reported an alleged misuse of United States Agency for International Development grant money meant for the Center which then suspended financing of its Cuba programs while it investigated being overcharged $570,000 meant for use by the Center to buy radios and flashlights.

On March 1, 2008, Sixto was selected from the Office of Intergovernmental Affairs and appointed by Republican President George W. Bush as a Special Assistant to the President for Intergovernmental Affairs, as well as becoming the Deputy Director of the Office of Public Liaison.

When he heard of the investigation Sixto resigned from his new position as Presidential Aide a few weeks later on March 20, 2008.

On December 19, 2008, Sixto pled guilty to embezzlement of government funds for his own use, both while he was at the Center and while he was in service to the President.

On March 18, 2009, Sixto, was fined $10,000 and sentenced to 30 months in prison.

Reaction 
In 2014, National Endowment for Democracy said they support the Center for a Free Cuba.

References 

Cuban expatriates in the United States
Anti-communist organizations
Anti-communist organizations in the United States
Governments in exile

Political repression in Cuba
Resistance movements
Cuba–United States relations
20th century in Cuba
21st century in Cuba